Vaino Väljas  (born 28 March 1931 in Külaküla, Hiiumaa, Estonia) is a former Soviet and Estonian diplomat and politician. Väljas was leader of the Communist party in then Soviet-occupied Estonia in 1988–1991, and the leader of Democratic Estonian Workers Party in 1992–1995 in independent Estonia.

Biography 

He was born on 28 March 1931 on the island of Hiiumaa in  Estonia. After Estonia had been occupied and annexed in 1940, and invaded and reoccupied in 1944 by the Stalinist Soviet Union, Väljas became a member of the Soviet Communist Party in 1952. In 1955, he graduated from Tartu State University.

In 1949, he began working at the Komsomol. From 1955 to 1961 he held the office of First Secretary of the Central Committee of the Leninist Young Communist League of Estonia. From 1961 to 1971, Väljas was First Secretary of the Tallinn City Committee of the Communist Party of Estonia. He was the Chairman of the 6th Supreme Soviet of the Estonian SSR in 1963–1967. From 1971 to 1980, he was Secretary of the Central Committee of the Estonian communist party. Since Väljas was considered to have Estonian "nationalist inclinations", he was removed from Estonia by the then communist party leadership in Moscow, and instead appointed by the Soviet central government as the Ambassador of the Soviet Union to Venezuela in 1980, and to Nicaragua in 1986. 

As the Singing Revolution along with the Estonian independence movement both gained momentum in 1988, the relatively "liberal communist" Väljas was recalled by the Soviet leadership from Nicaragua and appointed by Gorbachev as leader of the communist party in the Soviet-occupied Estonia. Formally, he was first secretary of the Communist Party of the Estonian SSR from 16 June 1988 to April 1990, and its chairman from April 1990 to August 1991. The Communist party lost its monopoly of power in February 1990. Väljas later voted for the Estonian Restoration of Independence in August 1991.

Awards 

  Order of Lenin (1965)
  3 Orders of the Red Banner of Labour (1958, 1971, and 1973)
  Order of Friendship of Peoples (1981)
  Order of the National Coat of Arms (2002)
  Order of the White Star (2006)
  Aadu Luukas Mission Award (2017)
  Tallinn Coat of Arms (2021)
  Order of the Liberator (Venezuela, 1986)

Notes

References

1931 births
Living people
People from Hiiumaa Parish
Heads of the Communist Party of Estonia
Members of the Supreme Soviet of the Estonian Soviet Socialist Republic, 1971–1975
Members of the Supreme Soviet of the Estonian Soviet Socialist Republic, 1975–1980
Members of the Supreme Soviet of the Estonian Soviet Socialist Republic, 1980–1985
Members of the Supreme Soviet of the Estonian Soviet Socialist Republic, 1985–1990
Resigned Communist Party of the Soviet Union members
Voters of the Estonian restoration of Independence
Seventh convocation members of the Supreme Soviet of the Soviet Union
Eighth convocation members of the Supreme Soviet of the Soviet Union
Ambassadors of the Soviet Union to Nicaragua
Ambassadors of the Soviet Union to Venezuela
University of Tartu alumni
Recipients of the Order of Lenin
Recipients of the Order of the Red Banner of Labour
Recipients of the Order of Friendship of Peoples
Recipients of the Order of the National Coat of Arms, 3rd Class
Recipients of the Order of the White Star, 2nd Class